The 6th British Independent Film Awards, given on 4 November 2003 at the Hammersmith Palais, London, honoured the best British independent films of 2003.

Winners
Best Actor:
Chiwetel Ejiofor - Dirty Pretty Things
Best Actress: 
Olivia Williams - The Heart of Me
Best British Documentary:
Bodysong 
Best British Independent Film:
Dirty Pretty Things
Best British Short:
Dad's Dead  
Best Director:
Stephen Frears - Dirty Pretty Things
Best Foreign Film:
Cidade de Deus (City of God), Brazil (2002) 
Best Production
In This World
Best Screenplay:
Steven Knight - Dirty Pretty Things
Best Supporting Actor/Actress: 
Susan Lynch - 16 Years of Alcohol
Best Technical Achievement:
In This World - Peter Christelis for the editing.  
Most Promising Newcomer
Harry Eden - Pure

References

British Independent Film Awards
2003 film awards
Independent Film Awards
2003 in London
November 2003 events in the United Kingdom